The Bull Museum, also known as the Rendalen Village Museum, is located at Rendalen's old parish farm dating from 1747 in Bergset, Norway. This was the birthplace and childhood home of the author Jacob Breda Bull (1853–1930). The collection includes the cradle he lay in as a child and furniture from his workroom in Copenhagen.

The yard around the vicarage includes, among other things, the grave of the horse Vesleblakken from Bull's short story. The yard is maintained by Rendalen Hagelag. The museum is a venue for various cultural events. Every summer, the play Morosamme kropper og arme kroker based on Bull's works is performed at the museum grounds.

Here there are a school museum, a bank museum, and a large musical collection connected with the musician Ottar E. Akre.

References

External links
Bull Museum homepage

Rendalen
Museums in Innlandet
Literary museums in Norway